Phanomsok was a town in Thailand in Phanomsok Province. In 1906, Phanomsok and three other Thai provinces were ceded to French Indochina. it is now located in Oddar Meanchey province Cambodia.

See also
Phanomsok Province

Towns in Cambodia
Populated places in Oddar Meanchey province